Czarnogłów  is a village in Mińsk County, Masovian Voivodeship in the administrative district of Gmina Dobre, in east-central Poland.

References

Villages in Mińsk County